Dulewala is a village in Bathinda district, Punjab, India. 

Dulewala is 15.3 km distance from its Mandal Main Town Phul . Dulewala is 39.2 km distance from its District Main City Bathinda . And 150 km distance from its State Main City Chandigarh . .

Alike, Bhai Rupa Patti Kangar, Bugran, Burj Gill, Burj Mansa, Chotian are the villages along with this village in the same Phul Mandal.

Nearby Villages of this Village with distance are Kangar (4.5 km), Bhai Rupa (4.7 km), Dialpura Bhaika (4.7 km), Adampura (5.7 km), Sandhu Khurd (5.9 km). Near By towns are Bhagta Bhai ka (13.7 km), Phul (15.3 km), Nathana (21.1 km), Rampura Phul (22.7 km).The origin of this village was settled when there was a fierce flood in old Dulawala (old village). The people left their house and came to the area where they lived and settled down, which is about 500 meters from the old village. Due to the absence of flood water, this place was distributed by the government to the people by distributing plots, which is now also known as model village. The nearest village is Salabatpura under the same scheme. In this village a government primary school, with high school and village support, Sant Baba Mani Singh ji

Villages in Bathinda district